Kale (also spelled Kha Lel or Khale) is a large village in Kyain Seikgyi Township, Kawkareik District, in the Kayin State of Myanmar. According to 2014 Myanmar Census, the total population in Kale is 5,355. The  Kha Lel village tract contains 5 villages and in 2014, it had a total population of 8,869 people.

People from Kale 
Saw Ba Oo

References

External links
 
 "Kale Map — Satellite Images of Kale" Maplandia World Gazetteer

Populated places in Kayin State